Cultural and Scientific Treasuries is a 13-part Iranian television documentary series by Mahmoud Shoolizadeh. In this series, precious Iranian handwritten manuscripts are analysed in each episode according to their subjects such as astronomy, history, politics, economy, medicine, religion, Koran, calligraphy, painting, miniature, travel literature and illumination.

Technical specifications and film crew 

Betacam SP, 13 parts, each 15 min, Documentary, Iran, 1996
Researcher, script writer and director: Mahmoud Shoolizadeh 
Producer: Javad Najmeddin (Aftab TV, USA)

Iranian television series
1990s Iranian television series
1996 Iranian television series debuts